

132001–132100 

|-id=005
| 132005 Scottmcgregor ||  || Scott A. McGregor (born 1956), Chief Executive, first president and chairman of the Broadcom Foundation, supported the Broadcom MASTERS, a Society for Science & the Public program, that inspires middle schools students worldwide to participate in a science competition. || 
|}

132101–132200 

|-bgcolor=#f2f2f2
| colspan=4 align=center | 
|}

132201–132300 

|-bgcolor=#f2f2f2
| colspan=4 align=center | 
|}

132301–132400 

|-bgcolor=#f2f2f2
| colspan=4 align=center | 
|}

132401–132500 

|-id=445
| 132445 Gaertner ||  || Christian Gärtner (1705–1782), German craftsman, merchant, amateur astronomer, and astronomy populariser || 
|}

132501–132600 

|-id=524
| 132524 APL ||  || The Johns Hopkins Applied Physics Laboratory (APL), developers of numerous space missions, including NEAR Shoemaker and many others || 
|}

132601–132700 

|-id=661
| 132661 Carlbaeker ||  || Carl Wilhelm Baeker (1819–1882), German watchmaker and amateur astronomer, discoverer and co-discoverer of six comets || 
|}

132701–132800 

|-id=718
| 132718 Kemény ||  || John George Kemeny or Kemény János György (1926–1992), Hungarian-born American mathematician, co-developer of the BASIC programming language || 
|-id=719
| 132719 Lambey || 2002 PF || Bernard Lambey (born 1934), French animator and popularizer of astronomy, co-founder of the Astronomical Society of Montpellier || 
|-id=792
| 132792 Scottsmith ||  || P. Scott Smith (born 1922), American physics teacher, primarily responsible for inspiring the discoverer to become an astronomer || 
|-id=798
| 132798 Kürti ||  || Stefan Kürti (born 1960), Slovakian amateur astronomer and discoverer of minor planets || 
|}

132801–132900 

|-id=820
| 132820 Miskotte ||  || Koen Miskotte (born 1962), Dutch confectioner and amateur astronomer, active within the Dutch Meteor Society || 
|-id=824
| 132824 Galamb ||  || József Galamb (1881–1955), a Hungarian-American mechanical engineer || 
|-id=825
| 132825 Shizu-Mao ||  || Ye Mao (Shiqing; 1231–1322), Chinese chief executive of Zibei County (now Wenchang City), Shizu ("earliest ancestor") of the discoverer Ye Quan-Zhi || 
|-id=874
| 132874 Latinovits ||  || Zoltán Latinovits (1931–1976), a Hungarian actor. This minor planet was discovered on the actor's 71st birth anniversary, on 9 September 2002. || 
|}

132901–133000 

|-id=903
| 132903 Edgibson ||  || Edward Gibson (born 1936) was one of the first scientist-astronauts, selected for NASA Group 4 in 1965. He was CAPCOM for Apollo 12 and science pilot for Skylab 4, setting a new spaceflight record and conducting landmark solar research. Ed is also a noted author and U.S. Astronaut Hall of Fame inductee. || 
|-id=904
| 132904 Notkin ||  || Geoffrey Notkin (born 1961), co-host of the popular Science Channel series Meteorite Men || 
|}

References 

132001-133000